Robert McCullough is a former basketball player from New York. He was widely known as a streetball player at Rucker Park. McCullough and Fred Crawford started the Rucker Pro Tournament in honor of mentor Holcombe Rucker.

Basketball
McCullough attended Benedict College in South Carolina with Ernie Morris. In college, he averaged 36 points per game.  This made him the second highest scorer in the nation. He scored 2100 points in 3 years.

In the 1965 NBA draft, he was taken in the 12th round (91st overall) by the Cincinnati Royals. He was cut to make room for Oscar Robertson.

Post-basketball career
McCullough later went on to earn further degrees and become a New York City guidance counselor and social worker.  He studied at Master of Science degree from Lehman College and studied additionally at New York University, Cornell University and Hunter College. He serves as a staff member for Rucker Park. He founded a program called Each One Teach One, which was honored by Charles Rangel.

References

Living people
African-American basketball players
American men's basketball players
Benedict Tigers men's basketball players
Lehman College alumni
Point guards
Shooting guards
Street basketball players
Year of birth missing (living people)
21st-century African-American people